= Khilafah Ammah =

Khilafah Ammah (خلافة عامّة) is a type of Islamic governmental concept introduced by Shah Waliullah in his book Izalatul Khafa'an Khilafatul Khulafa.

In that book he introduces a unique classification of khilafah (Caliphate) into 'Ammah' (ordinary) and 'Khassah' (extraordinary). Whatever has so far been explained concerning the qualifications, the modes of election or functions and duties of the khalifah, pertain to what Shah Waliullah terms as Khilafah Ammah.

This latter type of khilafh, Khilafah Ammah, can be established at any point of time in history whenever the necessary conditions exist. A khalifah (Caliph) who belongs to the category of khilafah 'Ammah, does not enjoy the lofty level of faith from the community.

Members of the community do support his appointment on account of high level of knowledge and integrity, but they do so merely on the basis of their opinion in that behalf and not pursuant to any revelational indication or Prophetic approval to that effect.
